Chah Abdol-e Fariyab (also Romanized as Chāh ‘Abdol-e Fārīyāb; also known as Chāh ‘Abdol) is a village in Golashkerd Rural District, in the Central District of Faryab County, Kerman Province, Iran. At the 2006 census, its population was 154, in 38 families.

References 

Populated places in Faryab County